John Alfred Prestwich (1874 – 1952) was an English engineer and inventor. He founded JA Prestwich Industries Ltd in 1895 and was a pioneer in the early development of cinematography projectors and cameras. The company also manufactured famous JAP motorcycle engines.

He worked with S.Z. de Ferranti and later cinema pioneer William Friese-Greene.

He was awarded the Edward Longstreth Medal by the Franklin Institute in 1919.

References

External links
 http://www.haringeyindependent.co.uk/news/5083801.print/
 http://www.victorian-cinema.net/prestwich.htm

1874 births
1952 deaths
Cinema pioneers
British motorcycle pioneers
English company founders